Mark Cavagnero Associates is a San Francisco, California-based architecture firm, founded by Mark Cavagnero, FAIA in 1988. The Firm's portfolio is of various public-serving projects for public, non-profit and institutional clients.

Current Projects
 California State Capitol Visitor Center, Sacramento, CA
 Treasure Island Development Plan, San Francisco, CA
 Congregation Emanu-El Renovation, San Francisco, CA
 San Francisco Conservatory of Music, Ute and William K. Bowes Center for Performing Arts, San Francisco, CA
 UCSF Joan and Sanford I. Weill Neurosciences Building, San Francisco, CA
 UCSF Conference Center, San Francisco, CA
California Film Institute Sequoia Theater Renovation, Mill Valley, CA
 Laney College Library, Oakland, CA
 West Valley College Art Center, Saratoga, CA
 West Valley College Library, Saratoga, CA
 Salesforce, Tokyo, Japan
Salesforce, Paris, France
 Salesforce, Dublin, Ireland
 Salesforce, Sydney, Australia 
Salesforce, Hyderabad, India
Salesforce, Chicago, IL
Salesforce, Atlanta, GA
Salesforce West, San Francisco, CA
 555 Howard Langham Hotel, San Francisco, CA (with Renzo Piano Building Workshop)
 San Francisco State University, Liberal and Creative Arts Building, San Francisco, CA
 Seminary Housing Marin County, Mill Valley,  CA
 Community Music Center, San Francisco, CA
 Quincy Courthouse, Quincy, CA
 Placer Courthouse, Auburn, CA
 Santa Clara Courthouse Renovation, San Jose, CA
 The Hamlin School, San Francisco, CA
 Museo Italo Americano, San Francisco, CA

Completed Projects
 San Francisco Airport, Consolidated Administrative Campus, San Francisco, CA (with Perkins + Will)
 Moscone Center Expansion, San Francisco, CA (with SOM)
 Quest Diagnostics, Secaucus, NJ
 Monterey Bay Aquarium, Bechtel Family Center for Ocean Education and Leadership, Monterey, CA
 Santa Rosa Junior College, Luther Burbank Theater, Santa Rosa, CA

 Saint Mary's College High School Student Chapel, Berkeley, CA
LightHouse for the Blind and Visually Impaired, San Francisco, CA
College of Marin Academic Center, Kentfield, CA (with TLCD Architecture)
 San Francisco Public Safety Campus, San Francisco, CA (with HOK)
Diane B. Wilsey Center for Opera, San Francisco, CA
 Salesforce East, San Francisco, CA
Salesforce Tower, San Francisco, CA
Salesforce Plaza, San Francisco, CA 
Salesforce Courtside Lounges at Chase Arena, San Francisco, CA
Salesforce, Indianapolis, IN
Salesforce, New York, NY
Salesforce, London, UK
Salesforce, Munich, Germany
Salesforce, Amsterdam, Netherlands
The Terrace, at the California Academy of Sciences, San Francisco, CA
UC Berkeley Wurster Hall Fabrication Shop Addition, Berkeley, CA
 Palega Recreation Center, San Francisco, CA
SFJAZZ Center, San Francisco
 Palo Alto Art Center, Palo Alto, CA
 Mammoth Lakes Courthouse, CA
 East Bay Center for the Performing Arts, Richmond, CA
 Whole Foods Market, Oklahoma City, OK
Oakland Museum of California, Oakland, CA
Sava Pool, San Francisco, CA
UCSD 7th College Neighborhood Planning Study, San Diego, CA
 Park City Museum, Park City, UT
Headlands Center for the Arts, Marin Headlands, CA
 Community Foundation Santa Cruz County, Santa Cruz, CA
 Durant Hall, University of California, Berkeley, Berkeley, CA
ODC Dance Theater, San Francisco, CA
Marin Horizon School, Mill Valley, CA
Community School of Music and Arts at Finn Center, Mountain View, CA
Trinity School, Menlo Park, CA
 The Tannery Arts Center, Digital Media and Creative Arts Center, Santa Cruz, CA
 Clovis Memorial District Conference Center, Clovis, CA
Chronicle Books Headquarters, San Francisco, CA
Whole Foods Market, Chicago, IL
California Palace of the Legion of Honor, San Francisco, CA
 Brava Theater Center, San Francisco, CA
Rafael Film Center, San Rafael, CA
De Young Museum Exhibition, San Francisco, CA

Awards
Mark Cavagnero Associates received the 2015 Maybeck Award the 2011 Distinguished Practice Award, and the American Institute of Architects (AIA) California Council's 2012 Firm Award, "the highest honor the AIACC can bestow on an architectural firm."

References

External links
 Mark Cavagnero Associates website
 http://www.aiasf.org/page/Center_for_Opera/Diane-B.-Wilsey-Center-for-Opera.htm

Architecture firms based in California
Architecture in the San Francisco Bay Area
1993 establishments in California
Companies based in San Francisco